This is a list of past and present rolling stock owned and operated by Croatian Railways, consisting of diesel locomotives, electric locomotives, diesel multiple units, electric multiple units and railroad cars. When the company began operation in 1991, it was with a collection of equipment inherited from „ŽTP Zagreb“ – a Croatian division of Yugoslav Railways. Much of this equipment was later refurbished/modernized and remains in use today. Over the years, Croatian Railways has supplemented this initial fleet with new orders and with new acquisitions of secondhand equipment from other operators.

Diesel locomotives

Electric locomotives   

Currently HZ Putnicki Promet and HZCargo maintains respectivelly 17  and 29 Electric HŽ 1141 Locomotives, all of which will undergo modernization and upgrade under contract signed with the Koncar company last year. HZ is leasing further 9 HŽ 1141 locomotives to third parties. Of the total 46 HŽ 1141 locomotives currently active, 17 Locomotives are used pulling Passenger coaches and 29 are used in HZCargo, however 3 HŽ 1141 locomotives were damaged in recent rail accidents and are out of service due to extensive repairs. Eventually all HŽ 1141 locomotives currently in service with the Croatian railways will be transferred and solely used by HZCargo, leaving HŽ 1142 as sole locomotive with HZPP Putnicki Promet.

DMUs       
  
HZ, national railway operator will introduce 7 additional Diesel electric train sets for regional passenger service, all 7 train sets should be delivered by end of 2025.  National rail operator also plans to purchase additional intercity trains, 6 sets for total of €50 million, or just over €8.3 million per train on Zagreb - Split route.  Current HŽ 7123  lacks the capacity for the route which in summer months is very popular with the tourist. However as the line between Ogulin - Split isn't electrified, currently only Diesel powered trains or DMUs have the range, there are plans to build a link between Dareznica, via Otocac to Perusic and on to Gospic, Gracac and Split, which would be eventually electrified, however these are longer term plans. One of the requirement for six new DMUs is that they're equipped with the tilting technology, which excludes Croatian manufacturer Koncar.  Alstom, Stadler or Simens could be providing six new trains, which won't be financed by the EU as it was the case with EMUs. New trains should be in service by 2026, according to the statement issued by the Croatian Government.

EMUs

Battery electric multiple unit 
National Rail operator Hrvatske Zeljeznice signed a contract for 2 Battery electric multiple unit train sets in contract valued at €17.1 million. National rail operator Croatian Railways hopes to secure an order of additional 60 brand new battery electric multiple units by 2030, replacing all but 20 DMUs that entered service in past decade, namely, HŽ 7022, HŽ 7023 and HŽ 7123 series.   National rail operator will install required battery storage/charging facilities at main railway stations that are currently not connected to electrified rail network. Stations include, Split, Osijek, Varazdin, Bjelovar, Virovitica, Gospic and Pula.

Passenger railroad cars 

Passenger railroad cars currently owned by Croatian Railways follow the general Eurofima coach design. Majority of them were manufactured in the factory Goša FOM between the 1970s and 1990s, and in 1991 they were inherited from Yugoslav Railways (division “ŽTP Zagreb”).

Mainly during 2000's, all railroad cars of the rolling stock were modernized in TŽV Gredelj to cope with demands of quality service in modern times. During the modernization, the cars intended for the transport of passengers in trains of the highest rank (including 1st and 2nd class cars, dining car and sleeping cars) received air conditioning, a completely new interior and exterior, installation of a closed vacuum toilet system, installation of doors with automatic control, etc. During the first years of company's existence and later, especially after the appearance of the first newly reconstructed cars in 2003, there was a surplus of first-class cars in the fleet, and for that reason, a large number of originally first-class cars were gradually transformed into lower-class cars. On later reconstructions, these cars only underwent some minor modifications (exterior painting in the new colour scheme, replacement of the seats and interior wall panels, etc.) and were gradually phased out of traffic during 2010's and 2020's.

Croatian Railways also posses the cars jointly produced by the factories "Janko Gredelj" and "Boris Kidrič"  in the mid-1980s, that were reconstructed and modernized in TŽV Gredelj between 2011 and 2012. Cars received air-conditioning, new side doors with automatic control, complete new interior, closed vacuum toilet system, etc.

Car types 
Although each car of the fleet has its own numerical ID, the type of the car is additionally recognized by the letter designation, which is a combination of capital and lowercase letters in the name of the car. The letter mark of the car, together with the numerical mark, is located on the sides of each car.

Capital letters in the letter mark of the car:

A – first class car

B – second class car

AB – first and second class car

WL – sleeping car

WR – dining (restaurant) car

Lowercase letters in the letter mark of the car:

aa – car with two axles (withdrawn from active rolling stock)

c – couchette car

ee – car with electricity supply exclusively through the passing electric line

t – car with seats and a passage in the middle (opposite to corridor car)

l – car with an audio system

m – car longer than 24,50 meters (80.3 feet)

List of active railroad cars 
Below is the list of active railroad cars in the rolling stock of Croatian Railways according to their types and characteristics as of May 2022:

Withdrawn stock 
HŽ 1061 (electric locomotive)
HŽ 1161 (electric locomotive)
HŽ 2061 (diesel locomotive)
HŽ 2062-1 (diesel locomotive)
HŽ 2042 (diesel locomotive)
HŽ 2043 (diesel locomotive)
HŽ 2131 (diesel shunter)
HŽ 2133 (diesel shunter)
HŽ 2141 (diesel shunter)
HŽ 6011 (electric multiple unit, withdrawn in 2009)
HŽ 7021 (DMU)
HŽ 7221 (railbus; withdrawn in 2009)
HŽ Al / Bl (passenger railroad car series for international and domestic traffic built between 1960's and 1980's, withdrawn during 2010's and 2020's)
HŽ Baat (two-axle passenger railroad car series for domestic traffic built in 1960's and withdrawn during the first half of 2000's)

Rented locomotives and test vehicles in Croatia 
HŽ series 1081 -> actually this were rented from PKP Poland
FS E 402B -> Italian locomotive was on test
V43 -> Hungarian locomotive used on Botovo-Koprivnica-Zagreb line

Renumbering 
In 1993 HŽ renumbered all their vehicles. This results in some confusion to the relation to their previous numbers. All other companies, which have been formed after dissolution of JŽ have kept the original numbers.

Higher speed passenger travel 

In Croatia, these well known international brand names were on test:

Cisalpino
Pendolino

Hrvatske Željeznice wants to modernise and speed up passenger traffic since currently they are not really able to reach speeds above 160 km/h. There have been tests performed with these two trains. Although shown as very good, they were just tested, not purchased, due to a lack of funds. It is planned to upgrade the track to 200 – 250 km/h in future. These units will most likely not be purchased at the end. A cheaper solution for passenger traffic is sought.

See also
 List of preserved steam locomotives in Croatia

References

External links 
http://www.railfaneurope.net/list/croatia/croatia_hz.html
Croatian forum about railways (multilanguage supported, posting questions allowed)

Rolling stock of Croatia
Rolling stock